A Midsummer Night's Gene is a science fiction parody novel of Shakespeare's play A Midsummer Night's Dream, written by  Andrew Harman and published in 1997 by Random House. It reflects the plot of the original play only slightly. It concentrates on two of the fairies and follows their attempts to play with genetic engineering in a modern English town.

1997 British novels
1997 science fiction novels
Comic science fiction novels
British science fiction novels
Parody novels
Novels based on A Midsummer Night's Dream
Random House books
Novels about genetic engineering
Modern adaptations of works by William Shakespeare